Kotasi is a former Maidu village in Plumas County, California.

See also
Greenville Rancheria of Maidu Indians

References

Former populated places in California
Former settlements in Plumas County, California
Maidu villages